The 2018 Monmouth Hawks football team represented Monmouth University in the 2018 NCAA Division I FCS football season as a member of the Big South Conference. They were led by 26th-year head coach Kevin Callahan and played their home games at Kessler Field in West Long Branch, New Jersey  Monmouth finished the season 8–3 overall and 4–1 in Big South play to place second.

Previous season
The Hawks finished the 2017 season 9–3, 4–1 in Big South play to finish in second place. They were invited to the FCS Playoffs, where they were defeated in the first round.

Preseason

Big South poll
In the Big South preseason poll released on July 23, 2018, the Hawks were predicted to finish in second place.

Preseason All-Big South team
The Big South released their preseason all-Big South team on July 23, 2018, with the Hawks having six players at seven positions selected along with two more on the honorable mention list.

Offense

Pete Guerriero – RB

Reggie White Jr. – WR

Jake Powell – TE

Ryan Wetzel – OL

Russ Clayton – OL

Defense

Tymere Berry – DB

Special teams

Pete Guerriero – KR

Honorable mention

Kenji Bahar – OB

Diego Zubieta – LB

Schedule

Game summaries

at Eastern Michigan

Hampton

at Lafayette

at Princeton

Wagner

Bucknell

Campbell

at Presbyterian

Charleston Southern

Kennesaw State

at Gardner–Webb

References

Monmouth
Monmouth Hawks football seasons
Monmouth Hawks football